Rosenberger is an old lunar impact crater in the southeastern part of the Moon. It was named after German astronomer Otto August Rosenberger. 

This crater is located in a region rich with prominent craters. The slightly smaller Vlacq is nearly attached to the northwestern outer rim of Rosenberger. Other nearby craters of note include Biela to the east, Hagecius to the south-southeast, and Nearch to the south-southwest. Due west past Vlacq is Hommel.

This crater has been heavily eroded by a history of impacts, so that the outer rim has become rounded and somewhat indistinct. As a result, the crater possesses only a shallow rise along the rim edge, and it nearly forms a circular depression in the surface. The satellite crater Rosenberger D, which is about 50 kilometers in diameter, intrudes into the southern rim of Rosenberger. A number of smaller, worn impact craters lie along the remainder of the rim and inner wall.

The interior floor of this crater forms a relatively level surface that is marked by several small craterlets. To the south-southeast of the midpoint is the worn remains of a small crater. At the midpoint there is a low central peak joined to a small craterlet to the north.

Satellite craters
By convention these features are identified on lunar maps by placing the letter on the side of the crater midpoint that is closest to Rosenberger.

References

 
 
 
 
 
 
 
 
 
 
 

Impact craters on the Moon